Cockscomb Mountain was named in 1921 because the outline of the summit was said to resemble a roosters comb. It is located in the Sawback Range in Alberta. The mountain is composed of sedimentary rock laid down during the Precambrian to Jurassic periods. Formed in shallow seas, this sedimentary rock was pushed east and over the top of younger rock during the Laramide orogeny.


Climate

Based on the Köppen climate classification, Cockscomb Mountain is located in a subarctic climate zone with cold, snowy winters, and mild summers. Temperatures can drop below −20 °C with wind chill factors below −30 °C. Precipitation runoff from the mountain drains into tributaries of the Bow River.

See also

 List of mountains of Canada
 Geography of Alberta

References

External links 
 Cockscomb Mountain photo: Flickr
 Cockscomb Mountain weather: Mountain Forecast
 Parks Canada web site: Banff National Park

Two-thousanders of Alberta
Mountains of Banff National Park
Alberta's Rockies